Towns in Wisconsin are similar to civil townships in other states. For a more detailed discussion, see Administrative divisions of Wisconsin#Town.

Frequently a village or city may have the same name as a town. As of 2006, Wisconsin had 1,260 towns, some with the same name. This list of towns and their respective counties is current as of 2002, per the Wisconsin Department of Administration.



List of towns

See also 
 List of municipalities in Wisconsin by population
 List of cities in Wisconsin
 List of villages in Wisconsin
 Administrative divisions of Wisconsin

References

External links
 Wisconsin Department of Administration. List of Wisconsin Municipalities in Alphabetical Order
 Wisconsin Department of Health Services. Wisconsin Cities, Villages, Townships and Unincorporated Places Listing
 Wisconsin Legislative Reference Bureau. State and local government statistics from the State of Wisconsin Blue Book 2015-2016
 League of Wisconsin Municipalities. Estimated Population per Square Mile of Land Area, Wisconsin Municipalities

 
Towns
Wisconsin